Nu Sigma Nu was an international professional fraternity for medicine, now existing as a handful of stable remaining chapters. It was founded on 2 March 1882 by five medical students at the University of Michigan, who identified as their immediate object "to further the best interests of our profession."  Later, its purpose was more fully stated as, "To promote scholarship, the development of better teaching, and generally in raising medical education to a higher level." As one of the earliest formed among all professional fraternities, Nu Sigma Nu was the first fraternal organization nationally to limit membership to medical students only. It can therefore claim that it was the first Medical Professional Fraternity.

History
The organization evolved quickly from its birth on 2 March 1882 under the leadership of five original members, all of the class of 1883, who, along with one other became the six recognized Founders of the Fraternity.  The six were:

The first five developed and signed the Constitution, and all six signed the original charter upon their initiation. Soon afterward, two professors were added to the membership rolls:  Donald McLean and George E. Frothingham. With these, and a fixed attention on professional achievement in its defined area of study, the fraternity had a relatively short period before contemplating a national expansion. The Grand Chapter of Nu Sigma Nu was formed in 1886. Its Beta chapter was formed in 1889 at the Detroit College of Medicine, and the fraternity added additional chapters during a vigorous period of growth from 1890 to 1933.

Nu Sigma Nu was the first of five national medical professional fraternities to form, and did so when the concept of a professional fraternity was far less common; it was a pioneer in establishment of the professional model.

Recent times
The fraternity became co-educational in 1972.

The national fraternity was dissolved in 1973, due to changing student interest and organizational turmoil. However, several well-established chapters survived and have flourished as semi-local institutions.  The remaining chapters occasionally communicate, but there is no continuation of national convention activity.

Chapters that aggressively maintained their ties with alumni and faculty for the benefit of student members, and who eyed long term viability, with alumni support, encouraged early growth of their building and scholarship funds. As early as 1901, Alpha chapter had accumulated enough capital to seek real estate investment, purchasing a suitable lot in Ann Arbor on Huron Street, near the medical school at that time. Historical records show Epsilon chapter at the University of Minnesota similarly sought to build early in its history, choosing a site at 429 Union Street, in Minneapolis, just two blocks from the medical school. Prior to this, Epsilon chapter rented space at the Masonic Temple at 6th and Hennepin in Minneapolis.

Prominent members
 William J. Mayo, one of the co-founders of the Mayo Clinic
 William E. Upjohn, founder of the Upjohn Pharmaceutical Company

Chapters

The Society had established 37 chapters by 1930, and 45 by circa 1953. Of that chapter roster, three remain active:

 Epsilon chapter, University of Minnesota - Minneapolis, MN
 Lambda chapter, University of Pennsylvania - Philadelphia, PA
 Rho chapter, Thomas Jefferson University (formerly Jefferson Medical College) - Philadelphia, PA

The Alpha chapter at the University of Michigan - Ann Arbor, MI disbanded in 2008.  The address of the former house was: 1912 Geddes Avenue, Ann Arbor, MI 48104 and housed 34 students.

Apparently, some of the dormant chapters nevertheless have maintained investment and/or scholarship funds. In 2011, the successors of the Beta Xi chapter at the University of Colorado announced their intent to contribute $650,000 for a "green roof" - an ecologically sensitive gathering place atop the Anschutz Health and Wellness Center at the new Anschutz Medical Campus at the University of Colorado. The chapter had expired in approximately 1973 at about the time the national was dissolved, though afterwards its alumni bought three houses which they leased to students for over a decade after the chapter's closure.

Nu Sigma Nu's few surviving chapters are stable and well-capitalized, with comfortable, and even impressive buildings in comparison with other professional fraternities. Chapter websites explain recent construction, remodeling and amenities designed to attract graduate students. The Epsilon and Lambda chapter buildings house 13, and 10 respectively, while the Rho chapter houses 12.

By the writing of the 1903 history there were already 2,093 members.  By circa 1954 Nu Sigma Nu had initiated over 30,000 members on 45 campuses.

Membership requirements
Varies by chapter. The Michigan chapter offered its facilities to house medical students and those in related fields. Other chapters appear to limit membership to only medical students.

Scholarships
The Alpha chapter previously offered funds to support an international residency to one student per year, paid for by a fund developed by the alumni of the chapter.

Publications
Several catalogs and histories were published by the Fraternity in its early years, including Nu Sigma Nu in 1903, and similarly titled versions in 1900, and other years. Some chapter had been diligent in publishing 'chapter bulletins' which included historical summaries, lists and commentary of national interest.

The disbanded national Fraternity has no website.  However, members and alumni correspond informally and may find contact information on individual chapter websites. Alpha chapter at Michigan may retain some of its archivist role: The national fraternity, at the 12th National Convention in March 1902, resolved to have the executive committee negotiate with Alpha chapter to serve as the archive keeper of the society, and set aside a room in their proposed new building specifically for this purpose.

Traditions
The 'fraternity yell' as adopted in 1903 was "Nu Sig Nu Sig Nu Sig Nu, Nu Sig Nu Sig Nu Sig Nu."

The flowers of the fraternity are the red and white carnation.

The crest is sometimes, but not always, versioned by chapter; Alpha chapter used an "Α" in the center, Epsilon chapter uses an "Ε" in the center, etc.

The official colors are Garnet, White and Yellow gold.

A number of songs are recorded in the 1903 history, pairing them with then-popular tunes to which the new words were written to fit. One of them, to the tune of Auld Lang Syne, is called ENYS GNAL DLUA:

Notes

Other professional medical fraternities
In addition to the medical fraternities listed here, there are numerous chiropractic, pre-health, pharmacy and nursing fraternities.
 Alpha Delta Theta, medical technology
 Alpha Gamma Kappa
 Alpha Kappa Kappa
 Alpha Phi Sigma, see Phi Delta Epsilon 
 Alpha Tau Sigma, Osteopathic, dormant
 Mu Sigma Phi, Philippines
 Omega Tau Sigma, veterinary medicine
 Omega Upsilon Phi, see Phi Beta Pi
 Phi Alpha Gamma, formerly Homeopathic, see Phi Chi
 Phi Beta Pi
 Phi Chi
 Phi Delta Epsilon
 Phi Kappa Mu, Philippines
 Phi Lambda Kappa
 Phi Rho Sigma
 Sigma Mu Delta, pre-medical
 Theta Kappa Psi

References

External links
 Alpha chapter website, accessed 5 July 2014
 Epsilon chapter website, accessed 5 July 2014
 Lambda chapter Website, accessed 5 July 2014

 
Professional medical fraternities and sororities in the United States
Medical associations based in the United States
Student organizations established in 1882
Former members of Professional Fraternity Association
1882 establishments in Michigan